Falta Amor may refer to:

Falta Amor (album), a 1990 album by Maná
"Falta Amor" (song), a 2020 song by Sebastián Yatra and Ricky Martin